"The Last Dance" is the second single by English singer-songwriter Clare Maguire, released from her debut album, Light After Dark. It was released in the United Kingdom on 20 February 2011 through Polydor Records.

Music video
A music video was made for the single and was uploaded to YouTube on 8 January 2011. The music video was directed by Alex & Liane.

Critical reception
Nick Levine of Digital Spy gave the song a four star rating, and said:

There's an unmistakable whiff of Fleetwood Mac - incense mixed with champers and crack? - to this second single from Clare Maguire. It's there in the passionately romantic but utterly relatable lyrics, it's there in the soaring, sing-along-soon-as-you-hear-it chorus, and it's there in the twinkly keyboard sounds that could almost have been nicked from the Tango In The Night studio tapes.

But this is The Mac pimped up for the teenies, with Maguire's mighty vocals - so committed and filled with sincerity, she'd sell you a papier-mâché pac-a-mac were she (literally) to sing its praises - shrouded by a bombastic but glittery production from Fraser T Smith. The result conjures up images of a muscular drag queen giving great Stevie Nicks in a Soho cocktail joint - the track, that is, not Maguire, who is actually very attractive as well as very talented..

Track listing

Charts

Release history

References

2010 songs
2011 singles
Clare Maguire songs
Songs written by Clare Maguire
Songs written by Fraser T. Smith
Polydor Records singles
2000s ballads
Synth-pop ballads